Saint-Martin-le-Mault is a commune in the Haute-Vienne department in the Nouvelle-Aquitaine region in west-central France.

Geography
The river Benaize forms most of the commune's north-eastern border, flows through the commune, then forms part of the commune's north-western border.

See also
Communes of the Haute-Vienne department

References

Communes of Haute-Vienne